Amor Jebali (born 24 December 1956) is a Tunisian football defender who played for Tunisia in the 1978 FIFA World Cup. He also played for Avenir Sportif de La Marsa.

References

External links
FIFA profile

1956 births
Tunisian footballers
Tunisia international footballers
Association football defenders
1978 FIFA World Cup players
1982 African Cup of Nations players
Living people
1978 African Cup of Nations players
AS Marsa players